Dichloronitrobenzene can refer to any of the following isomers of C6H3Cl2(NO2):
1,2-Dichloro-4-nitrobenzene
1,4-Dichloro-2-nitrobenzene
1,3-Dichloro-2-nitrobenzene

Nitrobenzenes
Chloroarenes